Ad Casub is a village in western Eritrea. It is located in Gogne District in the Gash-Barka region.

Nearby towns and villages include Algheden, Adal, Kieru, Markaughe, Hambok and Antalla.

Villages in Eritrea